is an anime television series directed by Gorō Taniguchi and animated by Shirogumi. The series aired from January to March 2019 on Fuji TV's +Ultra programming block.

Plot
Daisuke Dojima is a student who was kidnapped when he was a child. Now he and his friends are involved in one of the "Shibuya Drift" strange events, travelling 300 years into the future. There, the enemy known as "Revisions" fight using giant mechanical monsters. Daisuke and his friends are fighting to defeat the enemy and recover their present.

Characters
 

Daisuke is a 17-year old high school student at Seisho who has an extreme hero complex due to Milo telling him of his prophecy as a child, and grew up a strong believer of it. 
 

Milo is an agent of AHRV from the year 2388 who assists the SDS in their battle against the Revisions. Her future self had encountered the SDS as children and told Daisuke of his prophecy, a time she would personally experience near the end of the series. 
 

Gai is one of Daisuke's childhood friends and the twin brother of Lu. Officially, he is assigned to be the leader of the SDS
 

Lu is one of Daisuke's childhood friends and the twin sister of Gai.
 

Nicknamed Mari-mari, she is one of Daisuke's childhood friends and a member of SDS. Unlike the others, Mari-mari is originally very weak-willed, but she later overcomes this. 
 

Keisaku is one of Daisuke's best friends and a member of the SDS. Amongst the people in Shibuya who were transported to 2388, Keisuke came to the time period solely with his mother. 
 

Chiharu is a member of the Revisions who eagerly awaits for her new body to complete. 
 

Mukyu is a member of the Revisions. 
 

Nicholas is a member of the Revisions and the main antagonist of the series. In public, he takes the form of a small and harmless teddy bear, however his true body has the frightening ability to control gravity and wreak major havoc. 
 

Mikio is Daisuke's uncle. 
 

Yumiko is a teacher at Seisho. 
 

Kuroiwa is the police chief of Shibuya.
 

Muta is the Mayor of Shibuya. His ideals for survival highly differed from Kuroiwa, as he believed that negotiating with the Revisions would benefit them greatly. 
 

Izumi is a police officer who works with SDS.

Anime
Fuji TV announced the series during a livestream event in March 2018. The series is directed by Gorō Taniguchi and written by Makoto Fukami and Taichi Hashimoto, with animation by studio Shirogumi. Character designs for the series are provided by Sunao Chikaoka and adapted for CG animation by Jun Shirai. Kazuhiko Takahashi serves as director of photography, Takamitsu Hirakawa is the CG director for the series, Jin Aketagawa is the sound director, Akari Saitō is the editor, and Azusa Kikuchi composes the series' music. Other staff includes Yōhei Arai (mecha design), Makoto Shirata (BG concept artist), Yutaka Ōnishi (matte paint director), Ryū Sakamoto (art, setting), and Akemi Nagao (color design). The opening theme is "Wagamama de Gomakasanaide" by The Oral Cigarettes. The ending theme is "Curtain Call" by Weaver. The series premiered on Fuji TV's +Ultra timeslot from January 10 to March 28, 2019. The series was streamed on Netflix worldwide.

Reception
Writing for Monsters and Critics, writer Patrick Frye compared the science fiction anime to the isekai genre "except that an entire city is thrown into a new world via time travel." Although the character development, plot twists, and CGI animation were praised, it's claimed the "biggest negatives centered around the protagonist Daisuke who suffers from an obsessive hero complex for most of the first season ... which made watching the first eight episodes feel grating or insufferable." In May 2019, Anime News Network listed Daisuke one of the most, "scrubbiest scrublord protagonists”.

References

External links
  
 

2019 anime television series debuts
+Ultra
Anime with original screenplays
Fuji TV original programming
Kodansha manga
Netflix original anime
Shirogumi
Shōnen manga
Action anime and manga